Zurabad (also Romanized as Zūrābād and Zoor Abad; also known as Zuhrābād) is a city in, and the capital of Safayyeh District of Khoy County, West Azerbaijan province, Iran. At the 2006 census, its population was 917 in 197 households, when it was a village. The following census in 2011 counted 1,239 people in 310 households, by which time the village had been promoted to the status of a city. The latest census in 2016 showed a population of 1,147 people in 324 households.

References 

Khoy County

Cities in West Azerbaijan Province

Populated places in West Azerbaijan Province

Populated places in Khoy County